Steve Swindall (born 11 December 1982 in Scotland) is a Scottish former rugby union footballer who played for Glasgow Warriors. He played internationally for the Scotland 'A' side.

Club career 
Swindall came through the amateur ranks playing for Whitecraigs before playing for Glasgow Hawks. Swindall made his Glasgow Warriors debut in 2004 playing against Yorkshire Carnegie, then known as Leeds Tykes, in a pre-season friendly. He landed a professional deal with Glasgow Warriors in 2005. He left Glasgow to play for the Rotherham Titans in 2009 but stayed for only one year, rejoining Glasgow for a final season in 2010-11. He then played for amateur club Stirling County.

He now plays and coaches in Austin, Texas in the United States for amateur side Austin Blacks.

International career 
He played internationally for Scotland at age grades U18, U19 and U21 before being capped for the Scotland 'A' side.

References

External links
Swindall shocked at Scotland 'A' call up

1982 births
Living people
Scottish rugby union players
Glasgow Warriors players
Glasgow Hawks players
Whitecraigs RFC players
Stirling County RFC players
Rotherham Titans players
Amatori Rugby Milano players
Scotland 'A' international rugby union players
Rugby union flankers